Cardinalfishes are a family, Apogonidae, of ray-finned fishes found in the Atlantic, Indian, and Pacific Oceans; they are chiefly marine, but some species are found in brackish water and a few (notably Glossamia) are found in fresh water. A handful of species are kept in the aquarium and are popular as small, peaceful, and colourful fish. The family includes about 370 species.

They are distinguished by their large mouths, and the division of the dorsal fin into two separate fins. Most species live in tropical or subtropical waters, where they inhabit coral reefs and lagoons.

They are nocturnal, spending the day in dark crevices within the reef. At least some species brood their eggs inside the mouths of the males. Males do not feed during this incubation period. Males incubate the eggs in their mouth due to having longer heads and a larger jaw, which females do not acquire.

Classification
The fifth edition of Fishes of the World recognises only two subfamilies of the Apogonidae:

 Apogoninae
 Amioides H.M. Smith & Radcliffe, 1912
 Apogon Lacépède, 1801
 Apogonichthyoides J.L.B. Smith, 1949
 Apogonichthys Bleeker, 1854
 Archamia T.N. Gill, 1863
 Astrapogon Fowler, 1907
 Cercamia  J. E. Randall & C. L. Smith, 1988
 Cheilodipterus Lacépède, 1801
 Fibramia T. H. Fraser & Mabuchi, 2014 
 Foa  D. S. Jordan & Evermann, 1905
 Fowleria D. S. Jordan & Evermann, 1905
 Glossamia T.N. Gill, 1863
 Holapogon  T. H. Fraser, 1973
 Jaydia J. L. B. Smith, 1961
 Lachneratus T. H. Fraser & Struhsaker, 1991
 Lepidamia T. N. Gill, 1863
 Neamia  H. M. Smith & Radcliffe, 1912
 Nectamia D. S. Jordan, 1917
 Ostorhinchus Lacépède, 1802
 Paroncheilus J. L. B. Smith, 1964
 Phaeoptyx T. H. Fraser & C. R. Robins, 1970
 Pristiapogon Klunzinger, 1870
 Pristicon T. H. Fraser, 1972
 Pterapogon Koumans, 1933
 Rhabdamia KoumansM. C. W. Weber, 1909
 Siphamia M. C. W. Weber, 1909
 Sphaeramia Fowler & B. A. Bean, 1930
 Taeniamia T. H. Fraser, 2013
 Verulux T. H. Fraser, 1972
 Vincentia Castelnau, 1872
 Yarica Whitley 1930 
 Zapogon T. H. Fraser, 1972
 Zoramia D. S. Jordan, 1917

Pseudaminae
 Gymnapogon Regan, 1905
 Paxton C. C. Baldwin & G. D. Johnson, 1999
 Pseudamia  Bleeker, 1865
 Pseudamiops J. L. B. Smith, 1954

Timeline

References

External links
 Smith, J.L.B. (1961): "Fishes of the family Apogonidae of the Western Indian Ocean and the Red Sea". Ichthyological Bulletin; No. 22. Department of Ichthyology, Rhodes University, Grahamstown, South Africa.
 Hoey, A., Bellwood, D., & Barnett, A. (2012). To feed or to breed: Morphological constraints of mouthbrooding in coral reef cardinalfishes. Proceedings: Biological Sciences, 279(1737), 2426-2432.

 
Kurtiformes
Marine fish families
Taxa named by Albert Günther